The 1975 New York Yankees season was the 73rd season for the Yankees. The team finished with a record of 83–77, finishing 12 games behind the Boston Red Sox. The Yankees played at Shea Stadium due to the ongoing renovation of Yankee Stadium, which re-opened in 1976.

Bill Virdon opened the season as Yankees manager, but he was replaced on August 1 by Billy Martin. This would be the first of five stints as Yankees manager for Martin.

Offseason 
 October 22, 1974: Bobby Murcer was traded by the Yankees to the San Francisco Giants for Bobby Bonds.
 December 3, 1974: Joe Pactwa was purchased from the Yankees by the Alijadores de Tampico.
 December 20, 1974: Sam McDowell was released by the Yankees.
 December 31, 1974: Catfish Hunter was signed as a free agent by the Yankees.
 January 21, 1975: Gene Michael was released by the Yankees.

Regular season

Season standings

Record vs. opponents

Notable transactions 
 June 3, 1975: 1975 Major League Baseball Draft
Jim Beattie was drafted by the New York Yankees in the 4th round.
Willie Upshaw was drafted by the Yankees in the 5th round.
 June 13, 1975: Ed Brinkman was purchased by the Yankees from the Texas Rangers.

Roster

Player stats

Batting

Starters by position 
Note: Pos = Position; G = Games played; AB = At bats; H = Hits; Avg. = Batting average; HR = Home runs; RBI = Runs batted in

Other batters 
Note: G = Games played; AB = At bats; H = Hits; Avg. = Batting average; HR = Home runs; RBI = Runs batted in

Pitching

Starting pitchers 
Note: G = Games pitched; IP = Innings pitched; W = Wins; L = Losses; ERA = Earned run average; SO = Strikeouts

Relief pitchers 
Note: G = Games pitched; W = Wins; L = Losses; SV = Saves; ERA = Earned run average; SO = Strikeouts

Farm system

Notes

References 
1975 New York Yankees at Baseball Reference
1975 New York Yankees team page at www.baseball-almanac.com

New York Yankees seasons
New York Yankees
New York Yankees
1970s in Queens